Au railway station, or Au station, may refer to:

 Au SG railway station, in the Swiss canton of St. Gallen
 Au ZH railway station, in the Swiss canton of Zürich
 Au (Sieg) railway station, in the German state of North Rhine-Westphalia